Guadalupe Tagliaferri (born 26 June 1974) is an Argentine politician, currently serving as a National Senator for the Autonomous City of Buenos Aires since 2019. She previously served as Minister of Human Development of Buenos Aires in the administration of Chief of Government Horacio Rodríguez Larreta from 2015 to 2019. She belongs to the Republican Proposal (PRO) party.

Early life and education
Guadalupe Tagliaferri was born on 26 June 1974 in Buenos Aires. She studied political science at the University of Buenos Aires Faculty of Social Sciences, and counts with a master's degree on political administration.

Political career
Tagliaferri's involvement in politics began in Grupo Sophia, a think tank founded by Horacio Rodríguez Larreta. In 2009, she was appointed General Director for Women in the Buenos Aires City Government; she would later be appointed as Undersecretary of Social Promotion and, in 2013, she was appointed to preside the city's Council of Children and Adolescents' Rights.

In 2015, upon Rodríguez Larreta's election as Chief of Government (mayor) of Buenos Aires, Tagliaferri was appointed as Minister of Human Development and Habitat, succeeding Carolina Stanley, who was appointed Minister of Social Development of Argentina. As minister, Tagliaferri oversaw the demolition of the Elefante Blanco, an abandoned hospital in the city's Villa Lugano barrio, and its replacement with a new building for the Ministry of Human Development.

National Senator
Ahead of the 2019 legislative election, Tagliaferri was internally selected to be the second candidate in the Juntos por el Cambio list to the Argentine Senate, after Martín Lousteau. The list received 53.99% of the votes and Tagliaferri was comfortably elected alongside Lousteau. She was sworn in on 27 November 2019.

Tagliaferri is one of the Senate's supporters of the Voluntary Interruption of Pregnancy Bill brought forward by President Alberto Fernández in 2020.

References

External links

  (in Spanish)
 

1974 births
Living people
Politicians from Buenos Aires
Argentine political scientists
Members of the Argentine Senate for Buenos Aires
Women members of the Argentine Senate
Republican Proposal politicians
21st-century Argentine politicians
21st-century Argentine women politicians
University of Buenos Aires alumni